Josip Višnjić (Cyrillic: Jocип Bишњић; born 17 November 1966) is a Serbian retired footballer who played as a defensive midfielder, and a coach. His first name has also been spelled as Josif. 

After starting out at Radnički Niš, he went on to spend the vast majority of his career in Spain, as both a player and manager. In La Liga, he represented Rayo Vallecano and Hércules.

Playing career
In his country, Belgrade-born Višnjić played for FK Radnički Niš and FK Partizan. At nearly 25 he moved abroad, going on to spend the remaining years of his career in Spain, with three clubs: he started out with CP Mérida in the second division, then achieved both one promotion and relegation from La Liga with Madrid's Rayo Vallecano.

In 1995, Višnjić signed with Hércules CF in Alicante, playing 30 matches in his first season which ended in top flight promotion, followed by immediate relegation. After the club's demotion into the third level in 1999, the 32-year-old retired one year later, having appeared in 88 games in the Spanish top division (238 with both major levels accounted for).

Coaching career
Višnjić started coaching one year after retiring, starting with the reserves of his last club (he also briefly managed the first team) and working mainly in Spain, never in higher than division three. In the 2004–05 campaign, he worked with former Hércules teammate Manolo Alfaro at RSD Alcalá. Višnjić returned to manage Hércules in 2018.

Managerial statistics

References

External links

1966 births
Living people
Serbian people of Croatian descent
Footballers from Belgrade
Serbian footballers
Yugoslav footballers
Association football midfielders
Yugoslav First League players
FK Radnički Niš players
FK Partizan players
La Liga players
Segunda División players
Segunda División B players
CP Mérida footballers
Rayo Vallecano players
Hércules CF players
Serbian expatriate footballers
Expatriate footballers in Spain
Serbian expatriate sportspeople in Spain
Serbian football managers
Segunda División B managers
Hércules CF managers
RSD Alcalá managers
UD Las Palmas managers
Granada CF managers
UD Logroñés managers
CF Fuenlabrada managers
CD Toledo managers
Serbian expatriate football managers
Expatriate football managers in Spain